The Tarikh-i-Chitral is a book compiled and finalized in 1921 by Mirza Muhammad Ghufran on the order of Mehtar Shuja ul-Mulk (r. 1895-1936). It was written in Persian between 1911 and 1919, with its publication following in the year 1921 in Bombay, India.  After its publication Mehtar Shuja ul-Mulk ordered the burning of all copies of the book.

This book remained clandestinely in Chitral until the author's son, Ghulam Murtaza, recovered a copy and together with Wazir Ali Shah used it as a reference to compile the Nayi Tarikh-i-Chitral (1962).

Nayi Tarikh-i-Chitral
The Nayi Tarikh-i-Chitral is an Urdu translation of the original Tarikh-i-Chitral albeit with considerable additions based on the notes of Mehtar Nasir ul-Mulk (r. 1936-1943). The book revises and significantly enlarges the narrative of the original Tarikhi-Chitral based on the additional research of Sir Nasir ul-Mulk.

See also
Shahnamah-i-Chitral

References

1921 books
Persian-language books
History books about India
History of Chitral